Ivan the Fool may refer to:

 Ivan the Fool, a character from Russian folk fairy tales
 "Ivan the Fool" (story), an 1886 short story by Leo Tolstoy
 Ivan the Fool (Cui), a 1913 opera by César Cui